The Stoddard-Hamilton Glasair II is an American amateur-built aircraft that was designed by Tom Hamilton and produced by Stoddard-Hamilton Aircraft and later Glasair Aviation as a kit for amateur construction. It was first flown in 1989, and remained in production in 2012.

Design and development
A development of the earlier Glasair I, the Glasair II features a cantilever low-wing, a two-seats-in-side-by-side configuration enclosed cockpit accessed via gull-winged doors, fixed or retractable tricycle landing gear or fixed conventional landing gear and a single engine in tractor configuration.

The Glasair II was designed to FAR Part 23 standards and was extensively tested. Its wing has been tested to +10.5g. As indicated by its name, the aircraft is made from fiberglass. Its  span wing employs a NASA GA(W)-2  airfoil.

The manufacturer estimates construction time for the Super II RG or Super II FT versions as 3000 hours.

The Glasair II was later developed into the Glasair III.

Operational history
By December 2011 there were 1200 examples reported completed and flying making it one of the most successful two seat kit aircraft ever designed.

Variants

Glasair II-S
 stretch

Glasair Super II FT
Fixed tricycle landing gear version, in production in 2011.

Glasair Super II RG
Retractable tricycle landing gear version, in production in 2011.
Glasair Super II TD
Fixed taildragger landing gear version, in production in 1998, but production presently completed.

Specifications (Glasair Super II RG)

References

External links

Homebuilt aircraft
Single-engined tractor aircraft
Glasair II
Glasair II
Low-wing aircraft
Aircraft first flown in 1989